Leonardo Damián García (born Moreno, Buenos Aires, 31 August 1971) is an Argentine singer.

Discography 
 1994 – Entre Rosas – Avant Press EP
 1996 – Avant Press] – Avant Press
 1998 – Boutique – Avant Press (inédito)
 1999 – Vital
 2000 – Clap Beat
 2000 – Rascacielos EP – Camote galáctico con Gustavo Lamas
 2000 – Morrisey EP
 2001 – Mar
 2001 – Brat Davis EP
 2003 – Vos
 2005 – Cuarto creciente
 2008 – El Milagro del Pop 
 2009 – El Milagro Dance]
 2010 – Común y Especial
 2013 – Algo real

References

1970 births
21st-century Argentine male singers
Argentine LGBT musicians
Living people
People from Moreno Partido
20th-century Argentine male singers